Stefan Ashkovski (born 24 February 1992) is a Macedonian professional footballer who plays as a winger for Super League Greece club Lamia.

Club career
Born in Skopje, Macedonia, Ashkovski started his career in Serbia, playing with FK Teleoptik in the Serbian First League. After two solid seasons with Teleoptik, he moved to Partizan in summer 2012.  He made his debut for Partizan on November 11, 2012, against FK Radnički 1923. In the summer of 2013, he was loaned to another SuperLiga side, FK Donji Srem. He was loaned to Napredak Kruševac in 2014, but moved to the reigning Tippeliga champions, Strømsgodset, on a half year loan deal in July the same year. The Norwegian club has an option to buy the player, which was not used.

International career
In 2008, Ashkovski started representing Macedonia at U17 level, and he was a regular presence for the U19 and next for the U21 teams.

After a good start of season in the 2015–16 Serbian SuperLiga with FK Novi Pazar where he scored 3 goals in the first 6 rounds, on August 21, 2015, Ashkovski received a call from Macedonian national team coach Ljubinko Drulović. He made his senior debut for North Macedonia in a September 2015 European Championship qualification match against Luxembourg and has, as of 11 October 2021, earned a total of 8 caps, scoring no goals.

International stats

Honours

Partizan
 Serbian SuperLiga: 2012–13

Sepsi OSK 
Cupa României: 2021–22

References

External links

 
 

1992 births
Living people
Macedonian people of Bulgarian descent
Footballers from Skopje
Association football fullbacks
Macedonian footballers
North Macedonia international footballers
FK Teleoptik players
FK Partizan players
FK Donji Srem players
FK Napredak Kruševac players
Strømsgodset Toppfotball players
KF Shkëndija players
FK Novi Pazar players
Kayseri Erciyesspor footballers
Fortuna Sittard players
Górnik Łęczna players
PFC Slavia Sofia players
FC Botoșani players
Sepsi OSK Sfântu Gheorghe players
PAS Lamia 1964 players
Macedonian First Football League players
Serbian SuperLiga players
Serbian First League players
Eerste Divisie players
Ekstraklasa players
First Professional Football League (Bulgaria) players
Liga I players
Super League Greece players
Macedonian expatriate footballers
Expatriate footballers in Serbia
Macedonian expatriate sportspeople in Serbia
Expatriate footballers in Norway
Macedonian expatriate sportspeople in Norway
Expatriate footballers in Turkey
Macedonian expatriate sportspeople in Turkey
Expatriate footballers in the Netherlands
Macedonian expatriate sportspeople in the Netherlands
Expatriate footballers in Poland
Macedonian expatriate sportspeople in Poland
Expatriate footballers in Bulgaria
Macedonian expatriate sportspeople in Bulgaria
Expatriate footballers in Romania
Macedonian expatriate sportspeople in Romania
Expatriate footballers in Greece
Macedonian expatriate sportspeople in Greece